= Congolese Football Federation =

Governing body of association football in Republic of the Congo

CAF
- Founded: 1962
- FIFA affiliation: 1964
- CAF affiliation: 1965
- President: Jean Blaise Guy Mayolas
- Website: http://www.fecofoot.cg/

The Congolese Football Federation (French: Fédération Congolaise de Football, FECOFOOT) is the governing body of football in the Republic of Congo. It was founded in 1962, affiliated to FIFA in 1964 and to CAF in 1966. It organizes the national football league and the national team.

== History ==
Founded in 1962, the Congolese Football Federation was headed by thirteen presidents, some of whom, such as Sylvestre Mbongo and Thomas Gilbert Manckundia, have served several terms. It has experienced several crises that have led the Ministry of Sports to intervene and set up ad hoc committees.

Before 1962, Congolese football was run by two personalities who wrote some fine pages in its organization. Jacques Ndingahat, former president of the Brazzaville league from 1950 to 1955 who was responsible for organizing national competitions, and especially the famous Papa Odin, vice president of football of French Equatorial Africa, who played an important role in organizing Congolese football.

On 6 February 2025, the federation was suspended by FIFA due to interference by third parties in the affairs of the organisation amid an ongoing conflict with the Ministry of Sport. The suspension will be lifted when all third party influence is removed from the organisation. FIFA lifted the suspension on 14 May 2025.
